Fuchsia-flowered gooseberry is a common name for two gooseberry species with showy flowers native to western North America:

Ribes lobbii, native to northern California and the Pacific Northwest
Ribes speciosum, native to coastal central and southern California and Baja California